The Tri-nation series in Zimbabwe in 2010 (known as Micromax Cup and Zimbabwe Triangular Series 2010 too) was the name of the One Day International cricket tournament in Zimbabwe that was between India, Sri Lanka and Zimbabwe. The Zimbabwean boards expected better sponsorship offers with Indian cricket team involved. Sri Lanka won the series by beating Zimbabwe in the finals.

Squads

Points table

Group stage

Round 1

Round 2

Final

Media coverage

Television 
 Ten Sports : India, Sri Lanka, Bangladesh, Pakistan, Europe, Japan, Hong Kong in China, Indonesia, Maldives and Nepal.
 Doordarshan : India
 Zee Cinema : India
 Prime Sports : Middle East
 SuperSport : Africa
 Setanta Sports : Australia
 Asian Television Network : Canada
 StarHub : Singapore
 Astro : Malaysia
 CMC : Guyana, Barbados, Grenada, Jamaica, St Lucia, Antigua, Trinidad and Cayman Islands.

Internet 
 Ten Sports – (tensports.com)

References

External links 
 Tournament Homepage

2010 in cricket
One Day International cricket competitions
2010 in Zimbabwean cricket
International cricket tours of Zimbabwe